Qarah Tavaraq (also Romanized as Qarah Ţavaraq; also known as Qarāţūraq) is a village in Kolah Boz-e Gharbi Rural District of the Central District of Mianeh County, East Azerbaijan province, Iran. At the 2006 National Census, its population was 1,086 in 214 households. The following census in 2011 counted 873 people in 218 households. The latest census in 2016 showed a population of 841 people in 220 households; it was the largest village in its rural district.

References 

Meyaneh County

Populated places in East Azerbaijan Province

Populated places in Meyaneh County